Sarn is a small village in Powys, Wales.

There is a bus service through the village, with buses to Newtown, Churchstoke and Montgomery.

The historic parish church is Holy Trinity, part of the Ridgeway Benefice, in the Clun Forest deanery of the Church of England's Diocese of Hereford. The village also possesses a Baptist church.

There is a village hall, a primary school, and a public house — the Sarn Inn. A small group of farmers called the Sarnies beat the eggheads in 2005. A small recreation ground includes a tennis court and a bowling green.

Historic buildings in the parish include Great Cefnyberen, a Grade II timber-framed house, which dates from the mid-16th century.

Governance
It forms part of the Kerry community (in the ward of Sarn) and for Powys County Council the electoral division/ward of Kerry. It falls in the historic county of Montgomeryshire.

References

External links

Villages in Powys